Burmannia is a genus of flowering plants long thought of as related to orchids, although more recent studies suggest closer affinities with either the Dioscoreales or the Melanthiales. The plants are herbs, partially autotrophic (photosynthetic) but also partially parasitic on soil fungi.

Burmannia is native to tropical and subtropical parts of Africa, eastern Asia, Australia, and the Western Hemisphere. Three are regarded as native to the US:

The name Burmannia is a taxonomic patronym honoring the Dutch botanist Johannes Burman (1706 - 1779).

Systematics
Burmannia comprises the following species.

Notes

References

Burmanniaceae
Dioscoreales genera